Othona or Othonae was the name of an ancient Roman fort of the Saxon Shore at the sea's edge near  the modern village of Bradwell-on-Sea in Essex, England. The Old English name Ythanceaster for the locality derives from the Roman name.

History
The fort of Othona is in a typical late 3rd century style, and was possibly constructed during or shortly prior to the Carausian Revolt, making it contemporary with the forts at Dubris (Dover), Portus Lemanis (Lympne) and Gariannonum (Burgh Castle). According to the early 5th-century Notitia Dignitatum, which is the only contemporary document mentioning Othona, the fort was garrisoned by a numerus fortensium ("numerus of the brave ones").

Location and construction
Othona's location at the edge of the Dengie Peninsula was ideal for control of the estuaries of the rivers Blackwater and Colne, the latter leading to the important city of Camulodunum (now Colchester). The fort's shape was roughly trapezoidal, with rounded corners. A single exterior ditch surrounded the site. Although some of the Roman building material was reused in the 7th century Chapel of St Peter-on-the-Wall, enough of the rampart survived until the 17th century, when it was described by the local historian Philemon Holland as a "huge ruin". It has since been largely swallowed by the sea, leaving scant remains on view.

Christianity
The Othona community is a Christian community and retreat centre based at Bradwell-on-Sea and at Burton Bradstock in West Dorset. It was founded in 1946 by Norman Motley, a Church of England priest who had served as an RAF chaplain during the Second World War, and after the war as  rector of St Michael, Cornhill, 1956–1980.

Othona is a titular bishopric of the Roman Catholic Church; on 5 November 1991, Vincent Nichols was appointed Auxiliary bishop of Westminster and titular bishop of Othona by Pope John Paul II. He received his episcopal consecration on 24 January 1992 at Westminster Cathedral.

Bradwell is also the name of an episcopal area within the Church of England Diocese of Chelmsford, whose current bishop (2019) is John Perumbalath. The Chapel of St Peter-on-the-Wall is a mid-7th-century chapel and has survived from the period of the evangelisation of the East Saxon kingdom.

References

Sources

External links

Othona | Roman Britain

Saxon Shore forts
Roman fortifications in England
Coastal Essex